Anthony James Edgar (born 30 September 1990) is an English footballer who plays as a winger for Cray Valley Paper Mills.

Career
Edgar is a product of West Ham's youth team and scored his first career goal for West Ham United on 14 July 2010 in a pre-season friendly against Peterborough United. Replacing Junior Stanislas as an 88th-minute substitute, Edgar made his first-team debut for West Ham on 3 January 2010 in their 2–1 home defeat to Arsenal in the FA Cup third round.

Edgar signed for Bournemouth on 1 October 2009 on a one-month loan from West Ham. He made his professional, Bournemouth and Football League debut on 3 October 2009 in a 0–0 away draw against Port Vale. Although Bournemouth wanted to extend his loan for a second month the Football League blocked their request and Edgar returned to West Ham at the end of October after only four appearances.

Edgar was released by West Ham in June 2011. In July 2011 he signed for Yeovil Town on a two-year contract. Edgar made his debut against Exeter City in the 2–0 loss, and scored his first goal against Preston North End in the 4–3 loss. He was released at the end of the 2011–12 season.

After a successful trial, Edgar signed for Barnet in July 2012. He made his debut against Birmingham City on 14 August in the Football League Cup, playing the full 90 minutes. His first goal for the Bees came in a 4–0 win over Northampton Town on 19 October. His contract at Barnet was terminated by mutual consent on 12 April 2013, having not played for the club since November.

On 14 November 2013, Edgar signed for Dagenham & Redbridge on non-contract terms. After making seven appearances for Dagenham, all as a substitute, Edgar was released in January 2014.

Edgar signed for Italian Serie D side Triestina on 17 July 2014, but did not make any appearances during his time in Italy due to complications with his contract.

Edgar joined Braintree Town on a contract until the end of the season, in August 2015.

On 5 August 2016, Anthony went on to sign for Woking, agreeing a one-year contract just in time for the start of the season. On 13 August 2016, Edgar made his Woking debut in a 2–1 away defeat against Southport, replacing Zak Ansah with eight minutes remaining. A week later, Edgar scored his first Woking goal in a 3–1 home defeat against Dagenham & Redbridge, netting in the 48th minute.

On 7 January 2017, in a post-match interview, manager Garry Hill confirmed Edgar had been released.

Preceding his release from Woking, Edgar joined Southern League Premier Division side Hayes & Yeading United. On 29 January 2017, Edgar made his Hayes & Yeading United debut in a 2–1 home defeat against Kettering Town. A month later, Edgar scored his first goal for Hayes & Yeading in their Southern League Cup semi-final tie against Salisbury, featuring for 88 minutes before being replaced by Matt Sinclair in the 4–0 victory. On 7 March 2017, Edgar scored the equaliser in Hayes & Yeading's 2–1 defeat against Dorchester Town, however, he was later sent off in the 56th minute.

For the 2018–19 season, Edgar signed for Cray Valley Paper Mills. On 22 January 2020, the club announced Edgar's departure. Edgar joined Herne Bay later that month, scoring on his debut.

Edgar joined FC Romania for the 2021–22 season and scored on his debut. Later in the season he re-joined Cray Valley PM.

Personal life
He is a cousin of Jermain Defoe, and his brother, Ryan is a Dominica international who plays non-League football.

Career statistics

References

External links

1990 births
Living people
People educated at St Bonaventure's Catholic School
English people of Dominica descent
Footballers from the London Borough of Newham
Black British sportspeople
English footballers
Association football midfielders
English Football League players
National League (English football) players
Isthmian League players
Southern Football League players
West Ham United F.C. players
AFC Bournemouth players
Yeovil Town F.C. players
Barnet F.C. players
Dagenham & Redbridge F.C. players
U.S. Triestina Calcio 1918 players
Bishop's Stortford F.C. players
Braintree Town F.C. players
Woking F.C. players
Hayes & Yeading United F.C. players
Cray Valley Paper Mills F.C. players
Herne Bay F.C. players
F.C. Romania players
English expatriate footballers
Expatriate footballers in Italy
English expatriate sportspeople in Italy